Fernand Poukré-Kono (born in 1955, N'Djamena, Chad) was the Permanent Representative to the United Nations for the Central African Republic, taking office in January 2003.  He is married with two children.

Education
Poukré-Kono attained a degree in International Relations from the State University of Kiev, in Kiev, Ukraine.

Career
Poukré-Kono served as Chargé d'affaires at the Permanent Mission of the Central African Republic to the United Nations in New York City, as well as, First Counselor, and Legal Adviser for the Mission.  He has held two offices at the Ministry of Foreign Affairs in Bangui, Director for International Organizations and Chief of the United Nations Section.

See also

List of Permanent Representatives to the UN

References

1959 births
Living people
Permanent Representatives of the Central African Republic to the United Nations
People from N'Djamena